Antey may refer to:
 Almaz-Antey, a Russian state-owned company in the arms industry
 Antey-Saint-André, a comune in the Aosta Valley region of northwestern Italy
 Antey, a series of nuclear-powered cruise missile submarines designed in the Soviet Union for the Soviet Navy
 Antey-300, a long range surface-to-air missile 
 Antey-2500, a Russian anti-ballistic missile system 
 Antey Concern, a defense industry company based in Moscow, Russia